Escadrille Spa49 (also known as Escadrille MS49, Escadrille N49) was a squadron of the French Air Services active during World War I, from 1915 - 1918. Credited with 37 aerial victories over German aircraft, it won a unit citation on 8 November 1918.

History

The unit began on 18 April 1915 as Escadrille MS49. It was assigned to the VII Armee sector of the Western Front. Refitting with Nieuport fighters changed its unit designation; on 20 September 1915, it was dubbed Escadrille N49. In December 1916, when the squadron re-equipped with SPADs, it was finally named Escadrille Spa49.

Escadrille Spa49 won a citation on 8 November 1918, for its victories over 32 German airplanes and two observation balloons. In the last three days of the war, it would score three additional victories. The squadron finished the war where it had begun it, with VII Armee..

Commanding officers
 Capitaine Constantin Zarapoff: 18 April 1915
 Capitaine Jules de Boutiny: 22 May 1916
 Capitaine Charles Taver: 17 February 1918
 Lieutenant Roger Labauve: 8 November 1918.

Notable members
 Capitaine Paul Gastin
 Sous lieutenant Jean G. Bouyer
 Adjutant Paul Hamot.

Aircraft
 Morane-Saulniers: 18 April 1915
 Nieuports: 20 September 1915
 SPAD S.VIIs: December 1916
 SPAD S.XIs
 SPAD S.XIIIs.

End notes

Reference
 Franks, Norman; Bailey, Frank (1993). Over the Front: The Complete Record of the Fighter Aces and Units of the United States and French Air Services, 1914–1918 London, UK: Grub Street Publishing. .

Fighter squadrons of the French Air and Space Force
Military units and formations established in 1915
Military units and formations disestablished in 1918
Military units and formations of France in World War I
Military aviation units and formations in World War I